Statistics of Bangkok United in Asian competition.

Results

References

Bangkok United F.C.